Air pollution in Hong Kong is considered a serious problem. In 2004, visibility was less than eight kilometers for 30 per cent of the year. Cases of asthma and bronchial infections have soared due to reduced air quality. However, in recent years, the hours of reduced visibility in Hong Kong have decreased by significant amounts compared to the previous ten years.

Effects 

Declining regional air quality means visibility has also decreased dramatically. In 2004, low visibility occurred 18 per cent of the time, the highest on record, according to the Hong Kong Observatory.

Health implications 
The mortality rate from vehicular pollution can be twice as high near heavily travelled roads, based on a study conducted in the Netherlands at residences 50 metres from a main road and 100 metres from a freeway. Since millions of people in Hong Kong live and work in close proximity to busy roads, this presents a major health risk to city residents. The Hong Kong Medical Association estimates that air pollution can exacerbate asthma, impair lung function and raise the risk of cardio-respiratory death by 2 to 3 per cent for every increase of 10 micrograms per cubic metre of pollutants. Studies by local public health experts have found that these roadside pollution levels are responsible for 90,000 hospital admissions and 2,800 premature deaths every year. In 2009 the Australian government highlighted that air pollution in Hong Kong could exacerbate some medical conditions.

Former Chief Executive Donald Tsang declared that the high life-expectancy of Hong Kong demonstrates that concerns over air quality were not justified.

Professor Anthony Hedley, chair of community medicine at Hong Kong University, said: "Tsang is badly advised on current public health issues." Hedley added that air pollution levels in Hong Kong were extremely high, and could affect the lungs, blood vessels and heart. James Tien, former Chairman of the Liberal Party of Hong Kong, retorted, "Can [Tsang] really be confident that, if pollution continues to worsen, will he be able to promise the same life expectancy for our children and for our grandchildren?"

Economic impact 
Even as early as 2000, the total negative impact to the Hong Kong Economy, including cardiorespiratory disease was in excess of HK$11.1 billion. About 1,600 deaths a year might be avoided if air quality improves.

Made aware of fresh statistical and anecdotal evidence that pollution is driving away business and hurting Hong Kong's global competitiveness, James Tien called air pollution "a health issue, a lifestyle issue, a tourism issue, a business issue, and increasingly a political issue."

Merrill Lynch downgraded several Hong Kong property companies because of air quality concerns, and there have been warnings from the head of the Stock Exchange that pollution was scaring investors away. It said that the air quality in Hong Kong is now regularly so poor that its "long-term competitiveness is in some doubt", and advised clients to switch into developers in Singapore instead.

Pollution is dramatically harming not only the health of citizens of Hong Kong but also its economy, particularly relating to the ability to attract skilled foreign labour.

The chairman of the Danish Chamber of Commerce in Hong Kong said each year at least two or three people decline offers to work in the Hong Kong offices of member companies because of pollution: "It's going to cost us in the future if we don't clean up here".

"Five years ago, air quality wasn't a concern when people considered whether to relocate to Hong Kong", said Jardine Engineering Corp. Chief Executive James Graham. "In the past, one of the advantages was clean air. We can no longer say that". A London-based human resources consultant recommends that companies pay a 10 per cent hardship allowance to lure expatriates, partly because of air quality.

Causes 

As per the Clean Air Network, 53% of Hong Kong's pollution comes from local sources – power stations, idling engines of cars, trucks and buses and marine emissions. Hong Kong has only 5% of the land of the Pearl River Delta, but it creates 20% of its pollution, far more than its neighbouring cities of Shenzhen and Guangzhou.

A large portion of this pollution comes from coal-fired power stations in Hong Kong and vehicular traffic.  A significant contribution wafts down from the tens of thousands of factories in China's neighboring manufacturing heartland of the Pearl River Delta. The two major electricity companies of Hong Kong, namely China Light and Power and HK Electric Holdings emit more than 75,000 tonnes of carbon dioxide into Hong Kong's air daily. At 275 vehicles per kilometer, Hong Kong also has among the highest density of vehicles in the world.

Air-quality monitoring

Air Pollution Index - EPD
The Environmental Protection Department (EPD) in Hong Kong was established to solve problems and provide for a long lasting acceptable level of air quality.

In June 1995, instead of adopting internationally accepted benchmark index for pollution, it set up the Air Pollution Index as an indicator to pollution levels, both "General" and "Roadside".

Air Quality Objectives (AQOs) for seven widespread air pollutants were established in 1987 under the Air Pollution Control Ordinance (APCO), and have not been reviewed since it was set up. It is not clear how the levels are determined.

In October 2005, Task Force on Air Pollution criticised the Government for deluding itself with a pollution index that is a "meaningless" indicator of health risks. Professor Wong Tze-wai, at the Chinese University of Hong Kong commented that the current air pollution index "gives a false sense of security". Gary Wong, a professor at the Chinese University of Hong Kong's Department of Paediatrics and School of Public Health, said that under the current index, "some harmful pollution components aren't even recorded." In addition, he pointed out that there is no strategic plan or a timetable to tackle the problem, unlike in other countries

Street-level air quality regularly falls short of the government's Air Quality Objectives (AQOs), and even further short of the World Health Organization (WHO) Air Quality Guidelines, revised in October.

Academics called for Hong Kong Government to immediately update its air quality objectives set almost twenty years ago. For example, on 19 and 20 November 2006, roadside levels of respirable suspended particulates (RSPs – equivalent to PM10) exceeded the WHO guidelines by at least 300 per cent. Prof Anthony Hedley of the University of Hong Kong said in September 2007 that if Hong Kong's Air Pollution Index was based on WHO recommended levels, our readings would be "absolutely sky high" for most of the year. Secretary for Environment, Transport and Works Sarah Liao Sau-tung said the WHO targets were too stringent.

Air quality monitoring by the department are carried out by 11 general stations and three roadside stations. On 8 March 2012, the department started reporting data on fine suspended particulates in the air on an hourly basis, that are a leading component of smog. It began regular monitoring of PM2.5 levels, which measure particles 2.5 micrometres (µm) in diameter or less, at three stations since 2005, but the data were never publicized.

Real Air Pollution Index - Greenpeace
In September 2008, Greenpeace East Asia's Hong Kong office launched its "Real Air Pollution Index" as part of a campaign to get the government to update the Air Pollution Index to match WHO guidelines. The Real Air Pollution Index reports hourly pollution levels from 15 monitoring stations across the region and compares them to WHO standards.

Actions implemented

Switch to cleaner motor fuels 
All HK taxis and PLBs now run on LPG.

Incentives for scrapping pre-Euro IV vehicles 
In 2014, an ex gratia payment scheme was introduced to encourage vehicle-owners to scrap about 82,000 pre-Euro VI vehicles. This included a Citybus AEC Routemaster, which attracted controversy for its resulting loss of transport heritage.

Organizations working against air pollution

Clear The Air Hong Kong 
Clear the Air is a charity organisation committed to improving air quality in Hong Kong.
Current projects include:
Diesel – Recent government policies centred on voluntary schemes to phase out old polluting diesel vehicles (pre Euro 3) have proven ineffective. Further campaigns have to mandate a compulsory and scheduled phasing out of old polluting vehicles.
Energy – Aim to reduce harmful pollutants (PM2.5) from power station emissions through more stringent Air Quality Objectives (AQO). Work to improve energy savings and efficiency in all public and private buildings across Hong Kong.
Events & Education – Participating in and/or driving various territory wide environmental events and educational programs on clean air.
Idling Engines – Successful idling engine patrols have highlighted awareness among the public and the government of increased road side pollution leading to a ban on idling engines across Hong Kong to be tabled at Legco.
Indoor Air Quality (IAQ) – Free IAQ assessments for schools to be extended; the first campaign started April 2008.
Marine – Research conducted to implement a "smoky vessel spotter" scheme. More needs to be done to establish a Clean Port Policy scheme.
Tobacco – Clear The Air is advocating the Government to license all tobacco retailers, pressing the Financial Secretary to increase tobacco tax, pressing Legco to rescind the flawed qualified establishment exemptions and educating the public that the true cost of smoking to Hong Kong society is in excess of $73.32 billion per year.
Town Planning – Clear The Air defends the benchmark of "canyon effect" and Electronic Road Pricing (ERP) to auto-regulate urban traffic density.

Actions discussed

July 2006 Action Blue Sky Campaign 

The Action Blue Sky Campaign was an environmental campaign organised by the Environmental Protection Department, and launched by Chief Executive Donald Tsang in July 2006.  Its campaign slogan in Chinese was "全城投入　為藍天打氣" ("Let all of the city join in to fight for a blue sky"), while its campaign slogan in English is "Clean Air for a Cool Hong Kong!" The campaign hoped to win support from the public as well as the business community, including those businesses investing in the Pearl River Delta Region.

November 2007 vehicle idling ban
In November 2007, the government launched a public consultation on the proposal which would impose a fixed penalty of HK$320 on drivers who would violate a ban on idling, with taxi and minibus drivers likely to bear the brunt of the ban. The government said its action is due to the failure of motorists to heed many past campaigns switch off engines while waiting. Taxi and minibus drivers were opposed to the proposal.

It is illegal for any driver to leave their engine running if they get out of their vehicle. The courts have been awarding fines of HK$700. It is also illegal for taxis to loiter and minibuses to stop longer than necessary to pick up or put down passengers.  It is also illegal to park anywhere except in a designated parking place. This means that the vast majority of drivers who idle their engines are already in violation of at least one existing traffic safety law.

However, traffic wardens are under strict policy guidelines not to give out any tickets unless there has already developed a "serious" obstruction of the roadway or there have been multiple complaints made by the public; this is the "Selective Traffic Enforcement Policy" (STEP).

Traffic safety policing of idling vehicles, therefore, falls to private organisations like "mini spotters" who act as volunteer traffic wardens, making statements to police that can be prosecuted without traffic wardens having to issue tickets directly to the transport trade.

2008–09 Budget measures 
In the 2008–09 Budget, Financial Secretary John Tsang proposed a 100 per cent profit tax deduction for capital expenditure on environmentally friendly machinery and equipment in the first year of purchase, to encourage the business community to go green. He also suggested shortening the depreciation period of this equipment from the usual 25 years to 5 years. Neither proposal was actually passed.

New goals for 2014 
In January 2014, Secretary for the Environment Edward Yau Tang-wah announced that the HK government would update its air quality objectives, put in place in 1990, bringing them closer to WHO guidelines. According to the proposals, which will be set through legislation but have yet to be approved, seven types of emissions will be monitored. Respirable and fine particulates will also be monitored, but less stringently due to their more pronounced health impact. Targets set for three of the seven environmental pollutants are to be based on the WHO's loosest interim targets. Sulphur dioxide, nitrogen dioxide, carbon monoxide and lead would be subject to monitoring. Monitoring of particulates smaller than 2.5 µm (PM2.5) would be introduced under the proposals, but will be loosest of the three WHO interim targets. Yau asserted some local pollution had roots in mainland China, but did not mention any ongoing dialogue to address the issue with mainland authorities. Yau also did not address roadside pollution in Hong Kong. In total, 22 measures in all were suggested to contribute towards meeting the new objectives. Such measures would include phasing out heavily polluting vehicles, promoting hybrid or electric vehicles, and increasing the use of natural gas, but no actions have yet to be taken. Environmental impact assessments of projects such as the Hong Kong-Zhuhai-Macau bridge were conducted and approved under the old air-quality guidelines. Mike Kilburn from Civic Exchange and Professor Hedley of the University of Hong Kong expressed their disappointment, saying that it too little, and too long overdue. Kilburn said: " It is a move that we have been waiting years for years but we are extremely disappointed as the objectives are not strict enough to make any positive impact on air quality." Other environmental activists shared little hope in government efforts to reduce pollution and lamented the half-hearted implementation of measures, and the elusiveness of timetable for meeting the most stringent objectives.

See also

Environment of Hong Kong
Air Pollution in China
Air pollution in Macau

References

External links
Environmental Protection Department
Clear the Air
Mini Spotters
Greenpeace Hong Kong Air Pollution Index

Environment of Hong Kong
Air pollution in China
Air pollution by region